Zmago Jelinčič "Plemeniti" (born January 7, 1948) is a Slovenian politician and author. He is the head of the Slovenian National Party.

Jelinčič was born in the eastern Slovenian city of Maribor in what was then the Socialist Federal Republic of Yugoslavia. As a teenager, he moved with his family to the Slovenian capital Ljubljana, where he attended the Poljane Grammar School. He studied pharmacy at the University of Ljubljana, but later dropped out. He obtained his degree some thirty years later from University of Skopje, Macedonia. During his student years, he also practiced as a ballet dancer in the Ljubljana opera house.

In March 1991, he founded the Slovenian National Party, which won more than 11% of votes in the first elections to the Slovenian National Assembly in 1992.

Jelinčič was a candidate in the 2002 Presidential Elections and polled 8.49% of the first-round vote, coming third among nine candidates. He ran in the 2007 election as well, finishing 4th and winning almost 20% of the vote. In April 2017 he announced his intention to run once more in the 2017 Presidential Election.

Electoral performance

Presidential

References

External links

Interview with Zmago Jelinčič
Central register

1948 births
Living people
Politicians from Maribor
Slovenian National Party politicians
Ss. Cyril and Methodius University of Skopje alumni
Slovenian male ballet dancers